Operation Beaver Cage was a U.S. Marine Corps operation in the Que Son Valley that took place from 28 April through to 12 May 1967.

Background
Operation Beaver Cage was an operation by Special Landing Force Alpha comprising 1st Battalion, 3rd Marines and HMM-263 against the Viet Cong (VC) base areas in the Que Son Valley south of Danang

Operation
The operation commenced with a helicopter assault into the valley at 07:00 on 28 April. Contact was minimal until the night of 2 May when a VC unit attacked Company C's night defensive position and was forced back by artillery and AC-47 Spooky gunfire.

On 5 May as the Battalion headquarters was being withdrawn by helicopters it was attacked by VC mortar and small arms fire, the assault was repulsed without loss.

On 9 May Beaver Cage was joined with Operation Union. On 10 May Companies B and C engaged a large VC unit killing 86 VC.

Aftermath
The operation concluded on 12 May, Marine losses were 55 dead and 151 wounded, while VC losses were 181 killed and 66 captured.

References

Beaver Cage
Beaver Cage
United States Marine Corps in the Vietnam War
Battles and operations of the Vietnam War in 1967
Beaver Cage
History of Quảng Nam province